Murat Salimovich Iskakov (born 28 June 1972) is a Russian football manager and a former player. He is an assistant coach with PFC CSKA Moscow.

Coaching career
On 21 August 2019, Iskakov was dismissed as manager of FC Avangard Kursk.

References

External links
 

1972 births
Living people
Russian footballers
FC Armavir players
PFC Spartak Nalchik players
FC Spartak Semey players
FC Kaisar players
FC Zhetysu players
Kazakhstan Premier League players
Russian expatriate footballers
Expatriate footballers in Kazakhstan
Russian football managers
Russian expatriate football managers
Expatriate football managers in Kazakhstan
Association football defenders